The 72nd Buffalo Funds - NAIA Men's Division I  Basketball Tournament was held from March 18 to 24 at Municipal Auditorium in Kansas City, Missouri. The 72nd annual NAIA basketball tournament featured 32 teams playing in a single-elimination format. The Heart of America Athletic Conference was the host conference for the tournament. This was the Heart of America Athletic Conference's first year as a Division I conference.

The tournament got off to a surprising start, as five higher seeded teams lost on the opening day, including top-seeded Rogers State, who lost to William Jewell, who had only qualified for the tournament by receiving the Heart of America Athletic Conference's host bid into the field.

In the end, two unseeded teams, Rocky Mountain College of Montana and Columbia College of Missouri—neither of whom had ever won a game at the tournament prior to 2009—met in the championship game, having each disposed of three higher-ranked teams along the way.  Rocky Mountain won the championship with a 77-61 victory, claiming Rocky's first national basketball title.

Awards and honors
Leading scorer: Eric Palm, McKendree (IL)
Leading rebounder: Devin Uskoski, Rocky Mountain (MT)
Chuck Taylor Most Valuable Player: Devin Uskoski, Rocky Mountain (MT)
Most consecutive tournament appearances: 18th, Georgetown (KY)
Most tournament appearances: Georgetown (KY), 28th of 30, appearances to the NAIA Tournament
 Oklahoma Baptist won their 49th tournament game, tying them with Georgetown College (KY) for the most tournament wins all-time.

2009 NAIA bracket

  * denotes overtime.

See also
2009 NAIA Division I women's basketball tournament
2009 NCAA Division I men's basketball tournament
2009 NCAA Division II men's basketball tournament
2009 NCAA Division III men's basketball tournament
2009 NAIA Division II men's basketball tournament

References

NAIA Men's Basketball Championship
Tournament
NAIA Division I men's basketball tournament
NAIA Division I men's basketball tournament